Kuchela, also spelled kucheela, occasionally also kuchila, is a hot relish of the Trinidadian cuisine.

Main ingredient of kuchela is the pulp of unripe mangoes that has been grated and thoroughly strained, if necessary by drying. Afterwards it is mixed with amchar massala and various additional spices. Amchar massala is a blend of spices containing cilantro seeds, cumin, fennel seeds, fenugreek seeds, brown mustard seeds, and peppercorns. The hotness level is regulated by adding either fresh peppers (scotch bonnets and "congo peppers" (habaneros) being common) or a hot sauce. The relish is then seasoned to tasted with salt, sugar and garlic; vinegar is also common. By adding oil, usually mustard oil, the texture can be adjusted. As a relish, kuchela is used in a lot of ways, for example as a side dish to curries or pelau (a rice dish similar to pilaf) or as a topping for doubles.

Kuchela, as well as the contained spice blend amchar masala, has Indian roots. Roughly 40% of all Trinidadians are of Indian descent. Their ancestors came to Trinidad as indentured labourers from the mid 19th century on and brought with them their traditional recipes of their home provinces, which were subsequently adapted to the local offer of provisions. Nowadays kuchela (and amchar masala) are available as industrially produced, packaged goods in supermarkets. In neighboring Guyana, which as a former British colony shares parts of its colonial heritage with Trinidad, exists a similar relish called "mango achar".

See also
 List of condiments

References

External links 
 Illustrated preparation instruction at SimplyTriniCooking.com

Trinidad and Tobago cuisine
Condiments
Pickles